"Let's Rock the House" is a song by American singer La Toya Jackson. It is taken from her 1991 album No Relations. It was released as a single on 12" and CD formats with club remixes, and was released on the heels of Jackson's previous single, "Sexbox".

Track listing
 Album Version
 Radio Mix
 DigiTrax Mix
 Electrochic Mix
 J. Jordan Dub

References 

1992 singles
La Toya Jackson songs
House music songs
1991 songs